Patrick Nagatani (August 19, 1945 – October 27, 2017) was an American photographer and educator perhaps best known for his work relating to the unique history of Japanese Americans including their experience with internment camps.

Biography

Nagatani was born on August 19, 1945, in Chicago, just ten days after the atomic blast on Nagasaki.  A Sansei, he was the eldest son of John Shuzo and Diane Yoshiye Nagatani. In 1955, the Nagatanis moved to Los Angeles, where they settled in the Crenshaw District, which at one time had the largest concentration of Japanese-Americans in the country.

In Los Angeles, Nagatani attended Coliseum Street School, Audubon Jr. High School, and Dorsey High School. At Dorsey, he was an honor student, ran hurdles, and was an officer in student government.

It wasn't until he started college at Cal State L.A. that he discovered his passion for the arts. Prior to pursuing a MFA degree at UCLA, Nagatani taught for the Los Angeles Unified School District at Hamilton High School.

Later, he taught at Loyola Marymount University and at the University of New Mexico.

As an artist, Nagatani's works have been exhibited internationally and have been featured in numerous publications and films.

Nagatani died on October 27, 2017, at his home in Albuquerque.

Exhibitions

Selected solo exhibitions 

 1976 – Pal Gallery, Evergreen State University, Olympia, Washington
 1982 – Canon Photo Gallery, Amsterdam, The Netherlands, Chromo-Therapy Series
 1991 – Jayne H. Baum Gallery, New York City, Nuclear Enchantment
 2005 – Vermont Center for Photography, Brattleboro, Vermont, Chromatherapy
 2011 – Japanese American National Museum, Los Angeles, California, Desire for Magic: Patrick Nagatani 1978–2008
 2012 – Clay Center for the Arts and Sciences, Charleston, West Virginia, Desire for Magic: Patrick Nagatani 1978–2008
 2018 – University of Michigan Museum of Art, Proof: The Ryoichi Excavations

Selected group exhibitions 
 1976 – 1976 Member's Exhibition, Friends of Photography, Carmel, California
 1983 – The Big Picture, curated by Barbara Hitchcock and Arthur Ollman, Museum of Photographic Arts, San Diego, California
 1993 – Schneider-Bluhm-Loeb Gallery, Chicago, Illinois (four artists)
 2003 – Bridge: Photographs by Robert Clarke-Davis, Jocelyn Nevel, and Patrick Nagatani, Adrian College, Adrian, Michigan
 2013 – Private Universes / Personal Spaces, SCA Contemporary Art, Albuquerque, New Mexico (six artists)

Further reading

References

1945 births
2017 deaths
Photographers from Los Angeles
Photographers from Illinois
People from Chicago
Social documentary photographers
American portrait photographers
20th-century American photographers
American artists of Japanese descent
University of California, Los Angeles alumni